Old Salem is an unincorporated community in Bowie County, in the U.S. state of Texas. According to the Handbook of Texas, the community had a population of 50 in 2000. It is located within the Texarkana metropolitan area.

History
The area in what is known as Old Salem today was said to have first been settled by farming families during the second half of the 19th century. The oldest graves in the community's cemetery, located next to the local Baptist church, date back to 1880. There were several scattered farms and homes in the community in the 1930s. It then grew to have cattle operations during the rest of the 20th century. Its population was 50 in 2000.

Geography

Education
Old Salem had its own school in the 1930s. Today, the community is served by the Simms Independent School District.

References

Unincorporated communities in Bowie County, Texas
Unincorporated communities in Texas